Supramanian Mylvaganam Manickarajah was a Ceylon Tamil politician and Member of Parliament.

Manickarajah was born on 15 May 1908.

Manickarajah was the Illankai Tamil Arasu Kachchi's (Federal Party) candidate at the November 1963 by-election in Trincomalee held following the death of incumbent R. N. Rajavarothiam. He won the election and entered Parliament. He was re-elected at the 1965 parliamentary election.

References

1908 births
Illankai Tamil Arasu Kachchi politicians
Members of the 5th Parliament of Ceylon
Members of the 6th Parliament of Ceylon
People from Eastern Province, Sri Lanka
People from British Ceylon
Sri Lankan Tamil politicians
Year of death missing